Hawarden Airport , is an airport near Hawarden in Flintshire, Wales, near the border with England and  west southwest of the English city of Chester.

Aviation Park Group (APG) is based at the airport and provides handling and related services to private clients.  APG has a longterm tenancy agreement with Airbus UK, giving sole handling rights at the site.

A large Airbus factory, which produces aircraft wings, is located at the airport. The factory is known as the Broughton factory, named after the nearest village.

History

The aircraft factory at Broughton was established early in the Second World War as a shadow factory for Vickers-Armstrongs Limited. The factory produced 5,540 Vickers Wellingtons and 235 Avro Lancasters. PA474 is one of only two Lancaster aircraft remaining in airworthy condition out of the 7,377 that were built. PA474 rolled off the production line at the Vickers Armstrong Broughton factory at Hawarden Airfield on 31 May 1945, just after the war in Europe came to an end, so she was prepared for use against the Japanese as part of the ‘Tiger Force’. PA474 is now part of the RAF's Battle of Britain Memorial Flight.

Post-war the factory was used by Vickers to build 28,000 aluminium prefab bungalows.

The RAF's No. 48 Maintenance Unit was formed at Hawarden on 1 September 1939 and until 1 July 1957 stored, maintained and scrapped military aircraft, including the Handley Page Halifax, Wellingtons, Horsa gliders and de Havilland Mosquitoes. It was located on the northwest portion of the airfield.

No. 3 Ferry Pilots Pool/Ferry Pool, Air Transport Auxiliary, was based at Hawarden between 5 November 1940 and 30 November 1945.  Its pilots ferried thousands of military aircraft from the factories and maintenance facilities at Hawarden and elsewhere to and from RAF and Naval squadrons throughout the UK.

On 1 July 1948 The de Havilland Aircraft Company took over the Vickers factory and over the years built the following aircraft types:

 de Havilland Mosquito
 de Havilland Hornet
 de Havilland Sea Hornet
 de Havilland Vampire
 de Havilland Venom and Sea Venom
 de Havilland Dove and Devon
 de Havilland Comet 13 only, and two aircraft that became the prototypes for the Hawker Siddeley Nimrod
 de Havilland Canada DHC-1 Chipmunk
 de Havilland Canada Beaver(assembly only)
 de Havilland Sea Vixen
 de Havilland Heron

The company became part of Hawker Siddeley Aviation in the 1960s and the production of the Hawker Siddeley HS125 business jet, designed by de Havilland as the DH.125, became the main aircraft type produced by the factory for nearly forty years. Production (final assembly) was moved to the United States in 1996 when the 125 business was sold to the Raytheon Corporation. Some parts continued to be manufactured at Broughton for some years after. (Production of the aircraft stopped in 2013 due to the bankruptcy of then owner Hawker Beechcraft). In 1977 the Broughton factory became part of British Aerospace operations. It is now owned and operated by Airbus, and has continued to be the centre of wing production for all models of Airbus commercial aircraft. The airport land includes a football ground named The Airfield, home of Welsh Premier League side Airbus UK Broughton F.C., which has movable floodlights due to its proximity to the runway.

The following units were here at some point:

Airlines and destinations
Although there have been scheduled services to Hawarden in past years, including a service from Liverpool to London via Hawarden operated by British Eagle in the 1960s and later Air Wales in 1977 (see below), there are currently no public scheduled passenger flights to the airport; most flights are chartered, or corporate, but the airport has frequent air freight flights provided by the Airbus Beluga to transport aircraft wings to Toulouse, Hamburg Finkenwerder and Bremen for Airbus. Airbus previously considered the A330-300 and A340-500 to require too much of the limited 1,663m (5,460 ft) runway 04 at Hawarden, and chose the A330-200 as the base of a new version of the Beluga. A runway extension was considered, but abandoned when Airbus chose the A330-200 which could use the existing runway.

Until 2020, there were also regular shuttle flights to Bristol Airport (Lulsgate) and then on to Toulouse Blagnac Airport for Airbus workers. These were previously operated by Eastern Airways & the now defunct BMI Regional (later flyBMI) but were operated by Loganair using an Embraer 145 aircraft until the termination of the service due to the COVID-19 Pandemic, leading to the closure of the Loganair base at Hawarden. The airport is also used as a back-up for scheduled flights to Anglesey whenever Anglesey Airport is closed.

There is much private and general activity at the airport, adding considerably to the number of aircraft movements. Operators include Aviation Park Group, which provides air taxi and charter services, MerseyFlight Air Training School, North Wales Military Air Services (NWMAS) and National Police Air Service base a Eurocopter EC135 Helicopter at the airport. Also operating from Hawarden Airport is Williams Aviation Ltd, which offers private jet charter.

The Airfield is strictly PPR (prior permission required).

Statistics

Air Wales at Hawarden Airport
Air Wales began operations at Cardiff Airport on 6 December 1977 using a 9-seater Piper PA-31 Navajo Chieftain (G-BWAL) on its twice-daily scheduled route from Cardiff to Hawarden Airport, Flintshire - a destination which was billed as "Chester" (even though Hawarden is in Wales and Chester is the other side of the Welsh/English border). Clwyd County Council provided the company with a start-up grant of £10,000 on the grounds that the service would improve communications between North East Wales and Cardiff. The single fare was £16.50p. Notwithstanding the confined space of the aircraft, complimentary coffee was routinely served in-flight to passengers by the First Officer.

Service Centres
An aircraft service centre managed and owned separately from the Airbus operation is also located at the airport. Raytheon Systems opened a new facility in 2003, to support the Raytheon Sentinel entering service with the Royal Air Force.

Raytheon had a 125 and Beech 400 support centre on the airfield, which was renamed Hawker Beechcraft Ltd in early 2007. The service centre has had a number of owners over the years, the most recent being Beechcraft (formerly known as Hawker Beechcraft, and before that Raytheon). However, on 3 September 2013, the operation was sold to Marshall Aerospace (Cambridge) for an undisclosed sum. Recently, the service centre has gained approvals to service a number of Cessna and Beechcraft types.

North Wales Military Air Services (NWMAS) are also based here offering maintenance for classic military aircraft, such as the Jet Provost, Strikemaster and L-39, with three Strikemasters, one Jet Provost and an Aero L-39 operating from Hawarden for airshows and pilot training.

Radio Mandatory Zone 
Hawarden Airport is the first Airport in the UK to have a permanent Radio Mandatory Zone (RMZ) established.

After a 2-year consultation process this was approved by the Civil Aviation Authority (CAA) and took effect on 30 March 2017.

References

Citations

Bibliography
Barfield, Norman. (2005) Broughton - from Wellington to Airbus. Tempus. 
Smith, Ron. (2005) British Built Aircraft (Volume 5 Northern England, Scotland, Wales and Northern Ireland) Tempus.

External links

Hawarden Airport
Williams Aviation Ltd
Flintshire Flying School
NATS Aerodrome Information

Airports in Wales
BAE Systems facilities
Aircraft assembly plants in the United Kingdom
British shadow factories
Buildings and structures in Flintshire
Manufacturing plants in Wales